Flavobacterium eburneum is a Gram-negative and motile bacterium from the genus of Flavobacterium which has been isolated from soil from Taean-gun in Korea.

References

External links
Type strain of Flavobacterium eburneum at BacDive -  the Bacterial Diversity Metadatabase

eburneum
Bacteria described in 2017